R-18 regional road (previously part of M-8 highway) is a Montenegrin roadway.

History

M-6 highway was built as part of the larger M-8 highway within the Yugoslav highway network, spanning Bosnia and Herzegovina, Montenegro and Serbia. It connected Pljevlja with Foča in Bosnia and Herzegovina, and Prijepolje, Sjenica and Novi Pazar in Serbia. However, construction was never completed on the Montenegrin section of the road.

In January 2016, the Ministry of Transport and Maritime Affairs published bylaw on categorisation of state roads. With new categorisation, part of M-8 highway (west of Pljevlja) was downgraded to regional road and named as R-18 regional road.

Major intersections

References

R-18